The Oldehove is a leaning and unfinished church tower in the medieval centre of the Dutch city of Leeuwarden.

Oldehove is also the name of an artificial mound (terp) on which in the late 9th century a (Catholic) church dedicated to Saint Vitus was built. Construction of the adjoining Late Gothic tower began in 1529, after the citizens of Leeuwarden demanded a tower taller than the one in the city of Groningen, the Martinitoren. In charge were Jacob van Aken (or Aaken) and, after his death, Cornelis Frederiksz.

The tower's tilt began during construction. The builders tried to compensate for the tilt, but the project was stopped in 1532 (1533 according to another source). In 1595–1596, the then derelict church was demolished, but the tower remains. It consists mostly of brick, but the builders also used so-called Bentheim sandstone. There are two bells. A bell cast in 1633 by Hans Falck and a bell cast in 1637 by Jacob Noteman, weight . It is listed as a Rijksmonument, number 24331.

The tower has 183 steps. The top of the tower is displaced horizontally  from the centre. The original plan included attaching a new church to the tower, which would replace the old saint vitus church, but this was never realized. Custodian of the tower is Historisch Centrum Leeuwarden.

References

Sources
 Stenvert, R. et al. (2000). Monumenten in Nederland: Fryslân, p. 25, 41 and 189–196. Waanders Uitgevers, Zwolle, the Netherlands. .

External links
Oldehove.eu, official website

Religious buildings and structures completed in 1532
Towers completed in the 1530s
Towers in Friesland
Inclined towers
Rijksmonuments in Leeuwarden
1532 establishments in the Holy Roman Empire